(born 26 April 1978) is a Japanese arranger, musician and composer for the Giza Studio label. He is a former member of band The★tambourines. Since 2012 he is a member of the instrumental band Sensation. He arranged music for artists such as Miho Komatsu, U-ka Saegusa in dB, Mai Kuraki, Shiori Takei and many others from the Giza Studio label. He did back vocals for Rina Aiuchi. He participated in live concerts for artist such as Zard's since 1999, Koshi Inaba's solo live tours, Marie Ueda and Garnet Crow Symphonic Concert 2010 ~All Lovers~. He is active as an arranger and player as of 2020.

List of provided works as a composer

Akane Sugazaki
Promises

List of provided works as a lyricist

Aya Kamiki
Sakura E

Hayami Kishimoto
Yes or No?
from you from me

List of provided works as an arranger

Miho Komatsu
Camouflage
Kamisama wa Jitto Miteru

U-ka Saegusa in dB
Smile & Tears
Ryuusei no Nostalgia

Ai Takaoka
Nemurenai Yoru

Marie Ueda
Hanamonage
Shihaisha
Tomoshibi
Journey
Romantika

Shiori Takei
Yasashii Hizashi
Ano Umi ga Mietara
Futari no Sunny Day
Ryuusei
At Eighteen
Shiosai Letter

Saasa
Saite Hiraite
Uso,
eyes to eyes
Over The Rainbow
Naturally

Mai Kuraki
Love, Needing
Chance for you

Aiko Kitahara
Kinsenka

Aya Kamiki
Crash

grram
Atarashii Asa wa Kuru
Orange Sora

Sard Underground
Christmas Time
You and me (and...)

References

External links
Official website (in Sensation)
Official website (in the tambourines)

1978 births
Being Inc. artists
Japanese composers
Japanese male composers
Japanese music arrangers
Living people